John Gallagher is a former professional rugby league footballer who played in the 2000s and 2010s. He played at representative level for Ireland, and at club level for Batley in National League One. John would go on to make 18 official Test appearances for the All Blacks, winning each one. 

He attended St Patrick's Catholic Primary School in Birstall and St John Fisher's Catholic High, Dewsbury. He currently is the headmaster of a school in Beverley.

References

External links 
 Statistics at rugbyleagueproject.org

Living people
Batley Bulldogs players
English rugby league players
Ireland national rugby league team players
Place of birth missing (living people)
Year of birth missing (living people)
Schoolteachers from Yorkshire